Menodora, Metrodora, and Nymphodora (died ) are virgin martyrs venerated by the Roman Catholic and Eastern Orthodox churches. According to tradition, the three women were sisters from Bithynia in Asia Minor. They chose not to marry and to forsake the world. They found a home in a remote location and spent their days in fasting and prayer. When reports reached the governor of the region, Frontonius, that the ill had supposedly been healed as a result of their prayers, he ordered that they be arrested and brought before him. When they refused to forsake Christianity, the governor ordered that they be tortured and then killed. After their deaths, the governor was supposedly struck by lightning and killed as well. The sisters were buried at the Warm Springs in Pythias. Some of their relics were preserved at Mount Athos in the Protection cathedral of the Russian St. Panteleimon monastery and Metrodora's hand is at the monastery of the Pantocrator.

J. K. Rowling named the character Nymphadora Tonks in the Harry Potter series after the ancient martyr Nymphodora.

References

311 deaths
Saints from Roman Anatolia
4th-century Roman women
4th-century Christian martyrs
Groups of Christian martyrs of the Roman era
Year of birth uncertain
Late Ancient Christian female saints
Saints trios